The California Climate Change Executive Orders are a series of Executive Orders of the State of California signed by the Governor of California between 2004 and 2018 by Governors Arnold Schwarzenegger and Jerry Brown relating to efforts to reduce greenhouse gas emissions in California.

Summary

Individual orders

S-03-05
California Executive Order S-3-05 (June 2005, signed by Governor Arnold Schwarzenegger) sets greenhouse gas emissions reduction targets for the State of California and laid out responsibilities among the state agencies for implementing the Executive Order and for reporting on progress toward the targets.

Specifically, the Executive Order established these targets: 
 By 2010, reduce GHG emissions to 2000 levels
 By 2020, reduce GHG emissions to 1990 levels
 By 2050, reduce GHG emissions to 80 percent below 1990 levels

The first and second goals were enshrined into law by the legislation known as AB 32, or the Global Warming Solutions Act of 2006, which gave the California Air Resources Board broad authority to implement a market-based system (also known as cap-and-trade) to achieve these goals.

B-30-15
California Executive Order B-30-15 (April 2015, signed by Governor Jerry Brown) added the intermediate target of:
 By 2030, reduce GHG emissions to 40 percent below 1990 levels. 

This intermediate target was codified into law by SB 32, which was signed into law by Governor Jerry Brown on September 8, 2016. On July 17, 2017, the legislature passed AB 398, which authorized the Air Resources Board to operate a cap and trade system to achieve these emissions reductions.

B-55-18
California Executive Order B-55-18 (Sept 2018, signed by Governor Jerry Brown) took the further step of:

 By 2045, achieve statewide carbon neutrality.

References

External links
 
 

Greenhouse gas emissions in the United States
United States executive orders
California Environmental Protection Agency
Environment of California
Air pollution in California
Climate change policy in the United States
Energy policy of the United States
Politics of California